Cylon Wildlife Area is a tract of protected land located in the northeastern corner of St. Croix County, Wisconsin, managed by the Wisconsin Department of Natural Resources (WDNR). The wildlife area presents a unique opportunity to preserve the last public land in St. Croix County.

History
Early settlers came to the area in the early 1850s, settling where the town of Deer Park sits now. Before European settlers arrived, the Santee Sioux and the Ojibwa people lived in the general area.

The Wildlife Area falls within the bounds of the Western Prairie region of Wisconsin.

Cylon State Natural Area
Adjacent to the Cylon Wildlife area, the Cylon State Natural Area is a  collection of four separate areas featuring woodlands and sedge meadows. The land runs south of the Willow River, which acts as a boundary between the natural area and the wildlife area. The natural area is operated as a smaller part of the wildlife area.

References

External links
 U.S. Geological Survey Map at the U.S. Geological Survey Map Website. Retrieved February 3, 2023.
 Cylon Wildlife Area Map at the WDNR Website. Retrieved February 3, 2023.
 Cylon State Natural Area Map at the WDNR Website. Retrieved February 3, 2023.

State Natural Area
State Wildlife Area
Protected areas of Wisconsin
Geography of St. Croix County, Wisconsin
Protected areas established in 1975